Acinopus labiatus is a species of ground beetle in the subfamily Harpalinae, subgenus Acinopus (Nesarpax). It is endemic to Cape Verde.

References

Harpalinae
Beetles of Africa
Insects of Cape Verde
Endemic fauna of Cape Verde
Beetles described in 1843
Taxa named by Wilhelm Ferdinand Erichson